Clay Mull (born September 29, 1979) is an American Olympic speed skater who competed in the team pursuit at the 2006 Winter Olympics.

A 1998 South Point High graduate, first came to prominence as an inline skater as a youth, finishing second in the U.S. Junior Olympic Roller Skating Championships in the 14-15 age group in 1995. He became a speed skater after graduating from high school, and narrowly missed making the U.S. Olympic team in 2002. Mull placed sixth at the 2006 Torino Olympic Games as part of the team pursuit in speed skating.

References 

1979 births
Living people
American male speed skaters
Speed skaters at the 2006 Winter Olympics
Olympic speed skaters of the United States